Christopher Herndon IV (born February 23, 1996) is an American football tight end who is a free agent. He played college football at Miami (FL) and was drafted by the New York Jets in the fourth round of the 2018 NFL Draft.

Early years
Herndon was born with postaxial polydactyly and had two of his twelve fingers surgically removed shortly after birth. Herndon attended and played high school football at Norcross High School in Norcross, Georgia.

College career
Herndon attended and played college football at the University of Miami from 2015 to 2017. During his collegiate career, he recorded 86 receptions for 1,048 receiving yards and seven receiving touchdowns.

Collegiate statistics

Professional career

New York Jets
The New York Jets selected Herndon in the fourth round with the 107th overall pick in the 2018 NFL Draft. Herndon was the sixth tight end drafted in 2018.

On May 21, 2018, the New York Jets signed Herndon to a four-year, $3.17 million contract that includes a signing bonus of $711,364.

Throughout training camp, Herndon competed to be the starting tight end against Eric Tomlinson, Clive Walford, Neal Sterling, and Jordan Leggett. Head coach Todd Bowles named Herndon the fourth tight end on the depth chart to begin the regular season, behind Eric Tomlinson, Neal Sterling, and Jordan Leggett.

He made his professional regular season debut in the New York Jets’ season-opening 48–17 win at the Detroit Lions. In Week 2, Herndon earned his first career start and caught his two passes for 30-yards to mark the first receptions of his career during a 20–12 loss against the Miami Dolphins. On October 14, 2018, Herndon caught two passes for 56 receiving yards and scored his first career touchdown during a 42–34 win against the Indianapolis Colts in Week 6. Herndon caught his first career touchdown reception on a 32-yard pass from fellow rookie Sam Darnold during the third quarter. In Week 12, Herndon caught a season-high seven receptions for 57-yards during a 27–13 loss against the New England Patriots. On December 23, 2018, he caught six passes for a season-high 82 receiving yards and scored a touchdown as the Jets lost 44–38 against the Green Bay Packers in Week 16. Herndon gradually became the Jets’ primary receiving tight end during the season and surpassed Neal Sterling and Jordan Leggett on the depth chart. He finished the season as the Jets second-leading receiver behind Robby Anderson with 39 receptions for 502 yards and four touchdowns. He finished first among all rookie tight ends in receptions and touchdowns and second in receiving yards. He was named to PFWA All-Rookie Team, becoming the fourth Jets tight end to receive this award, joining Johnny Mitchell (1992), Anthony Becht (2000), & Jace Amaro (2014).

Herndon was suspended the first four games of the 2019 season for violating the NFL’s policy and program on substances of abuse. He was reinstated from suspension on October 7, 2019, and activated prior to Week 7. On November 12, 2019, Herndon was placed on injured reserve after a season ending injury.

Minnesota Vikings
On August 31, 2021, the Jets traded Herndon and a sixth-round 2022 NFL Draft pick to the Minnesota Vikings for a 2022 fourth-round pick.

New Orleans Saints
On August 3, 2022, Herndon signed with the New Orleans Saints. On August 23, 2022, he was released. He got suspended for eight games on November 16, 2022.

References

External links
New York Jets bio
Miami Hurricanes bio

1996 births
American football tight ends
Living people
People from Norcross, Georgia
Sportspeople from the Atlanta metropolitan area
Players of American football from Georgia (U.S. state)
Norcross High School alumni
Miami Hurricanes football players
New York Jets players
Minnesota Vikings players
New Orleans Saints players